Sphaerocylichna is a genus of deepsea snails or bubble snails, marine opisthobranch gastropod mollusks in the family Cylichnidae, the canoe bubbles or chalice bubble snails.

Species
Species within the genus Sphaerocylichna include:
 Sphaerocylichna incommoda

References

 Nomenclator Zoologicus info

Cylichnidae